Densusianu or Densușianu is a Romanian surname that may refer to:

Aron Densușianu (1837–1900), literary critic
Nicolae Densușianu (1846–1911), Romanian ethnologist, brother of Aron
Ovid Densusianu (1873–1938), Romanian poet, son of Aron

Romanian-language surnames